In mathematics, informally speaking, Euclid's orchard is an array of one-dimensional "trees" of unit height planted at the lattice points in one quadrant of a square lattice.

The name Euclid's orchard is derived from the Euclidean algorithm.

If the orchard is projected relative to the origin onto the plane  (or, equivalently, drawn in perspective from a viewpoint at the origin) the tops of the trees form a graph of Thomae's function. The point  projects to

  

See also
Opaque forest problem

References

External links
Euclid's Orchard, Grade 9-11 activities and problem sheet, Texas Instruments Inc.
 Project Euler related problem

Greek_mathematics
Lattice points